The 2021 WAC men's basketball tournament was the postseason men's basketball tournament for the Western Athletic Conference during the 2020–21 season. All tournament games were played at the Orleans Arena in Paradise, Nevada, from March 11–13, 2021. The tournament champion received the WAC's automatic bid to the 2021 NCAA tournament.

Seeds
6 of the 9 teams in the WAC were eligible to compete in the conference tournament. Dixie State and Tarleton State were ineligible due to their transition from Division II to Division I. California Baptist is eligible for the WAC basketball tournament this year after a change in rules from the WAC Board of Directors, which changed the transition period from four years to two years to compete in the conference tournament. CBU would still have to wait two more years to be able to compete in the NCAA Tournament. Chicago State cancelled their season after going 0–9, so they will not compete in the conference tournament. Teams were seeded by record within the conference, with a tiebreaker system to seed teams with identical conference records.

Schedule and results

Bracket

References

Tournament
WAC men's basketball tournament
Basketball competitions in the Las Vegas Valley
College basketball tournaments in Nevada
WAC men's basketball tournament
WAC men's basketball tournament
College sports tournaments in Nevada